Fairfield Beach is a neighborhood of Fairfield, Connecticut.

Location

Fairfield Beach is located to the south of downtown Fairfield, and the neighborhood extends south from Old Post Road to the Long Island Sound.  The neighborhood originally held a variety of income levels, with small family farms such as the Hauser farm on the corner of Reef Road and Charles Street on one end of the spectrum, and small summer cottages on the beach at the other. While only a few families lived there year-round in the early and mid-twentieth century, including the Barry, Flanagan, Hauser, Leverit and Laing families, the neighborhood began growing in popularity for year-round residents throughout the 1970s and 1980s.

Throughout the 1960s and 1970s the neighborhood was also known for its beach bars, including the "Beachside" across from Penfield Beach, and "Flanagan's" on the corner of Reef and Fairfield Beach Road.  Before Reef Road was widened, the corner of Reef and Fairfield Beach Road was home to several small stores, including "Danny's" and a fish-and-chips shop owned by Maynard Benson, called "Maynard's Reef." Flanagan's was originally owned by "Chippy" Flanagan but became the "Nautilus" under new ownership, and continued under this name until the 1980s, when the bar was bought, renamed the "Seagrape," and remodeled to attract the student crowd from Fairfield University.

Following the overwhelming onslaught of student renters from Fairfield University in the 1970s, and the aggressive expansion of the Seagrape's owners in the 1980s and 1990s, many original residents of the neighborhood fled, driven out by the noise and overcrowding.

The neighborhood has more recently again become popular with year-round residents due to its close proximity to the Long Island Sound beaches to the south and the downtown area with its train station to the north.  A recent surge in the neighborhood's popularity has led to a building boom, as many of the smaller old homes have been torn down and replaced with the larger new homes. Many of the newer homes have been constructed in a distinctive architectural style known as "Nantucket" or "beach" style.

Residents of the neighborhood are represented by several neighborhood organizations, including the Fairfield Beach Residents Association, which represents the entire beach area, and the Fair Acres Association, which represents residents residing within the blocks between Rowland Road and Penfield Road.

Traditionally, many Fairfield University students have lived in the neighborhood, and although their numbers have decreased in recent years as property values and rents have increased, there continues to be a significant student presence, leading to occasional conflict between students and permanent residents.

The area includes Jennings Beach and Penfield Beach; the Veterans Park; and the Fairfield Beach Club and the South Benson Marina.

There is a local school, Roger Sherman Elementary.

Gallery

External links
Fairfield Beach Residents Association

References

Fairfield, Connecticut
Neighborhoods in Connecticut